Charles H. Dewald (September 22, 1867 – August 22, 1904), also known as Charlie Dewald and Carl Dewald, was a pitcher in major league baseball for the 1890 Cleveland Infants. His record was 2 wins and 0 losses.

Life and career
Dewald was born on September 22, 1867, in Newark, New Jersey.

After leaving baseball, Dewald was named superintendent of all city cemeteries in Cleveland, Ohio, in April 1899. He resigned the position on May 25, 1903, due to ill health. He died in Cleveland on August 22, 1904, and was buried at Woodland Cemetery.

External links

1867 births
1904 deaths
Cleveland Infants players
Major League Baseball pitchers
19th-century baseball players
Dayton Reds players
Wheeling National Citys players
Wheeling Nailers (baseball) players
Sioux City Corn Huskers players
Oakland Colonels players
San Jose Dukes players
Toledo Black Pirates players
Memphis Giants players
Atlanta Windjammers players
Erie Blackbirds players
Baseball players from Newark, New Jersey
Burials at Woodland Cemetery (Cleveland)